Vidya Rao is an Indian Hindustani classical singer and writer. She is popular for her Thumri and Dadra.  She wrote a book on the late Naina Devi, Heart to Heart: Remembering Nainaji. Her daughter Aditi Rao Hydari is an actress.

Early life
Vidya Rao was born in Wanaparthy and grew up in Hyderabad. She did her graduation from Madras and later joined the Delhi School of Economics to do M.A. in Sociology.

Career
She worked with Centre for Women's Development Studies as a researcher for five years before quitting to concentrate on music.

She renders poetry of mystics like, Amir Khusro, Kabir etc.

She was set to make her acting debut through Mani Ratnam's Raavanan (2010) as the mother of Aishwarya Rai's character. However, her scenes were cut from the film's final version.

Personal life
She was married to Ehsaan Hydari. They have a daughter, Bollywood actress, Aditi Rao Hydari.

References

External links
 Official site
 The Love Life of Vidya Rao, Thumri Singer

Living people
Hindustani singers
Thumri
Indian women classical singers
Indian women non-fiction writers
Women biographers
Delhi School of Economics alumni
Singers from Hyderabad, India
Women writers from Telangana
Women Hindustani musicians
20th-century Indian biographers
Year of birth missing (living people)
Women musicians from Andhra Pradesh
20th-century Indian women singers
20th-century Indian singers
20th-century women writers